This is a list of places formerly administered as part the county of Derbyshire which is located in England.

 Appleby Magna
 Beighton ward, Sheffield
 Croxall
 Donisthorpe
 Dore, South Yorkshire
 Edingale
 Graves Park (ward)
 Meersbrook
 Mosborough (ward)
 Ravenstone, Leicestershire
 Stapenhill
 Stretton en le Field
 Totley
 Winshill

Derbyshire-related lists
Derbyshire, Places formerly in
History of Derbyshire
Former